Project Ragna Rok is a fictional plan from Mike Mignola's Hellboy comics.

It involved a secret team of Nazi scientists and occultists, headed by Rasputin, aiming at creating a doomsday weapon which could end World War II and bring about a victory for the Third Reich.

It was named after the apocalypse in Norse mythology, "Ragnarök".

Ragnarok Project

During the last stage of the second World War, confronted with the possibility of defeat, Adolf Hitler launched numerous “Doomsday” projects aimed at bringing about a Nazi victory, through either scientific or occult means. The Ragna Rok (Fatal Destiny) Project was one such. During his meditations in Italy, Grigori Rasputin was approached by Heinrich Himmler to lead a group of Nazi occultists in building weapons of mass destruction. Eventually, after recognizing the potential in Haupstein, Kurtz, and Kroenen, Rasputin assembled them as part of his Ragna Rok project.

Rasputin promised Hitler a “miracle” which would turn the tide of the war. Secretly, Rasputin hoped to trigger an apocalyptic event that would begin a new Eden.

On December 23, 1944, on Tarmagant Island, (a small island off the Scottish coast) Project Ragna Rok entered into its final phase. Rasputin called forth the key to the apocalypse from Hell. Complications arose when the key did not appear on Tarmagant Island, but rather in a ruined church in East Bromwich, England. Even worse, the key, serving as the massive stone right hand of an infant demon, was recovered by the Allies. The demon would later become Hellboy, and his right hand would be much sought after. Von Krupt viewed the project as a failure, and the team officially disbanded. Rasputin headed to the Arctic Circle in pursuit of a long-lost temple to the Ogdru Jahad, while Haupstein, Kurtz, and Kroenen cryogenically froze themselves until Rasputin needed them once again.

Team members

Klaus Werner von Krupt
Hitler's liaison with the project, General Von Krupt believed Rasputin's promises of a miracle, though he doubted the monk's ability to deliver. Entirely unaware of Rasputin's motives, he declared the project a failure when he failed to see results. Von Krupt died six months after being committed to Eisenvalt Sanitarium, his corpse discovered to be infested with beetles of unknown species or origin.

Portrayed by William Hoyland in the 2004 film, Von Kurpt appears in the movie prologue with his fate when US army forces invade unknown. Joel Harlow portrays Von Kurpt in the 2019 reboot.

Leopold Kurtz
A young Nazi occultist who threw his lot in with Rasputin and Project Ragna Rok. Kurtz relocated to a base in Norway with Kroenen and Haupstein after Rasputin's failure at Cavendish Hall. When Roderick Zinco found the severed head of Herman von Klempt, Kurtz registered his disapproval at von Klempt's inclusion in their plans. Kurtz later attacked the severed head after he caught it discussing treason with Kroenen, Kroenen accidentally stabbing Kurtz while rushing to defend his old friend. Kurtz is later revealed to have survived by Kroenen's stabbing and the following explosion, helping Zinco CEO Marsten in what he later learned to be the resurrection of the Black Flame.

In the 2019 film, Kurtz is portrayed by Dimiter Banenkin.

Ilsa Haupstein
Another Nazi scientist recruited by Rasputin for his Ragna Rok project, Ilsa displayed extreme devotion and loyalty. After Rasputin's ghost returned from the failure at Cavendish Hall, she helped maneuver Hellboy into the hands of Count Giurescu, a vampire who she fell in love with during the Second World War and was reviving. But Ilsa is contacted by the spirit of Rasputin to follow him to a mystical iron maiden that he has brought by Baba Yuga's servant. In an attempt to demonstrate her faith in Rasputin, who intended her to be by his side, Ilsa encased herself in the iron maiden under the notion that she would become a part of it and be able to survive the upcoming apocalypse. But Rasputin later learned that Ilsa immediately perished with her body serving as a new vessel for Hecate after her physical death at Hellboy's hands.

In the 2004 film, played by Bridget Hodson, Ilsa serves as one of the antagonists as Rasputin gave her eternal youth to act on his behalf. In the end, she remains by Rasputin's side as they are crushed to death by the Behemoth. Ilsa is portrayed by Vanessa Eichholz in the flashback sequence in the 2019 film reboot.

Karl Ruprecht Kroenen
The perpetually masked Kroenen attended university with Herman von Klempt. Recruited by Rasputin for the Ragna Rok project, Kroenen froze himself alongside Ilsa and Kurtz after the Tarmagant debacle, and resurfaced after the events at Cavendish Hall. Kroenen worked with Kurtz and Zinco, until Zinco's discovery of von Klempt's head. Moved by sympathy for his old colleague, Kroenen allowed von Klempt to tempt him into disobeying Rasputin. Kurtz overheard and attacked the head, forcing Kroenen to kill him. This triggered retribution by Rasputin's ghost which ended in a fiery explosion which killed both Zinco and Kroenen. Kroenen survived and resurfaced years later to acquire a vessel from the BRPD which he learned is intended for the Black Flame, having been tricked into thinking his group were bringing Rasputin back from the dead. A disillusioned Kroenen escaped with von Klempt, the two recruited by Varvara to join her cause of rebuilding Pandemonium on Earth. Kroenen ended up being incinerated by Varvara over his suspicions of her intentions.

In the 2004 film, played by Ladislav Beran, Kroenen serves as one of the antagonists with his character altered as an assassin and Thule Society member who heavily modified his body with a clockwork heart and later a hand prosthesis. He is played by Ilko Iliev in the 2019 film reboot.

Grigori Efimovich Rasputin
After being assassinated by Prince Felix Yusupov on December 17, 1916, Rasputin was revived and contacted by the Ogdru Jahad. They enlisted him as their mortal agent in the world. Soon after, Rasputin was contacted by the Nazis to begin development on an occult method for ending the war. From this, Project Ragna Rok was born. The Nazis sought to use Rasputin to defeat the Allies, but Rasputin knew this would never happen. He merely intended to use the Nazis' resources as long as he could to achieve his own goals: to trigger the apocalypse which would jumpstart a new Eden.

Though the Nazis believed he had failed, Rasputin knew that he had summoned Hellboy on the night of the 23rd. With Hellboy in Allied care, it took him many years to engender a situation where he could use Hellboy to summon the Ogdru Jahad. Rasputin succeeded at Cavendish Hall, but was ultimately thwarted. He tried again when he forced Hellboy into a confrontation with Hecate, but Hellboy destroyed her mortal form and Rasputin's ghost retreated. Some time later, Hecate would find his aimless spirit and explain that he was nothing more than a pawn to the Ogdru Jahad. Rasputin, infuriated, attacked her and was virtually destroyed. The Baba Yaga kept a small piece of his soul in an acorn she wore around her neck.

See also 
Millennium (Hellsing)

Hellboy
Fictional Nazis in comics
Characters created by Mike Mignola